The Southern Rights Party was a political party in the United States, organized exclusively in the Southern United States.  It was active for a few years in the early 1850s. Two or three members won seats in the House of Representatives.

References 

Political parties in the United States
Defunct political parties in the United States